Sterile alpha motif domain containing 11 is a protein that in humans is encoded by the SAMD11 gene.

References

Further reading